Catherine Stevens (born 7 August 1917) was a Belgian athlete. She competed in the women's high jump at the 1936 Summer Olympics.

References

External links
 

1917 births
Possibly living people
Athletes (track and field) at the 1936 Summer Olympics
Belgian female high jumpers
Olympic athletes of Belgium
Place of birth missing